Alden Tavern Site is a historic site in Lebanon, Connecticut. The tavern was originally built in 1738 and owned by Captain Alden. By 1850, it had passed to Alden's descendant, Mr. Wattles. The Alden Tavern is well known for being the site of the horsewhipping of a captive General Richard Prescott, commander of the British troops of Rhode Island, by the tavern's owner Captain Alden when he dined at Alden's tavern. The site was added to the National Register of Historic Places in 1998 and listed under the "Event" and "Information Potential" criteria. It was listed as only having fieldstone foundations remaining. A parking lot was paved over the site in 2010, adding 26 paved spaces and 70 spaces in overflow parking on a grass field. It is now known as the Alden Tavern Parking Lot by the town of Lebanon.

Owners 
In the American Revolutionary War the tavern was run by Captain Alden. Around 1850, it was owned by Mr. Wattles, a descendant of Captain Alden. The tavern's last owner or date of destruction is unknown, but it was part of the town green by the 1903 publication of Butterworth's book, Brother Jonathan.

Historical significance 
The Alden Tavern is well known for being the site of the horsewhipping of a captive General Richard Prescott, commander of the British troops of Rhode Island, by the tavern's owner Captain Alden. Several days after Prescott's capture, he was escorted to General George Washington's headquarters, but on the trip came to dine at Alden's tavern. Several books detail different accounts and portrayals of the exchanges which led to Prescott's whipping, all involving the Prescott being served "the common dish of corn and beans" and throwing the food on the floor. Three of Benson Lossing's books recount this tale, in The Pictorial Field-Book of the Revolution Volume 1 (1852), Our Countrymen (1855) and Lives of Celebrated Americans: Comprising Biographies of Three Hundred and Forty Eminent Persons (1869). It also appears in similar wording in The Boys of '76: A History of the Battles of the Revolution by Charles Coffin in 1876, with Prescott's line being: "Do you give me the pigs' feed". The story has persisted and a fictional account was referenced in 2010 in Martha Finley's Elsie Yachting with the Raymonds.

Fate 
The site was added to the National Register of Historic Places on April 13, 1998, and it was noted that fieldstone foundations remained. It was listed under the "Event" and "Information Potential" criteria with a period of significance between 1700-1874. The property is also listed as a contributing property for the Lebanon Green Historic District. The Alden Tavern site is now a parking lot on town-owned property adjacent to Lebanon's Community Center. Prior to the project, a phase 2 archaeological survey had to be completed, a notice for this survey was published in 2003. The town received a Small Town Economic Assistance Program grant for $250,000 to construct the parking lot. Coit Excavating won the contract with the lowest bid of $193,000 and began construction in April 2010 and was expected to be completed by May 31, 2010. The paved parking lot has 26 spots with 70 more for overflow in a grass field. On December 6, 2011, the Selectmen's Meeting the Board dissolved the committee because the project was successfully completed. It is now known as the Alden Tavern Parking Lot.

See also
National Register of Historic Places listings in New London County, Connecticut

References

Drinking establishments on the National Register of Historic Places in Connecticut
National Register of Historic Places in New London County, Connecticut
Drinking establishments in Connecticut
Lebanon, Connecticut
1738 establishments in Connecticut
Taverns in the American Revolution
Historic district contributing properties in Connecticut